The 177th New York State Legislature, consisting of the New York State Senate and the New York State Assembly, met from January 4, 1967, to May 25, 1968, during the ninth and tenth years of Nelson Rockefeller's governorship, in Albany.

Background
Under the provisions of the New York Constitution of 1938, re-apportioned in 1953, 58 Senators and 150 assemblymen were elected in single-seat districts for two-year terms. The senatorial districts consisted either of one or more entire counties; or a contiguous area within a single county. The Assembly districts consisted either of a single entire county (except Hamilton Co.), or of contiguous area within one county.

In 1964, the U.S. Supreme Court handed down several decisions establishing that State legislatures should follow the One man, one vote rule to apportion their election districts. A special Federal Statutory Court declared the New York apportionment formulae for both the State Senate and the State Assembly unconstitutional, and the State Legislature was ordered to re-apportion the seats by April 1, 1965. The court also ruled that the 1964 legislative election should be held under the 1954 apportionment, but those elected could serve only for one year (in 1965), and an election under the new apportionment should be held in November 1965. Senators John H. Hughes and Lawrence M. Rulison (both Rep.) questioned the authority of the federal court to shorten the term of the 1964 electees, alleging excessive costs for the additional election in an off-year.

The lame-duck Legislature of 1964 met for a special session at the State Capitol in Albany from December 15 to 31, 1964, to re-apportion the legislative districts for the election in November 1965, gerrymandering the districts according to the wishes of the Republican majority before the Democrats would take over the Legislature in January. The number of seats in the State Senate was increased to 65, and the number of seats in the Assembly to 165. County representation was abandoned in favor of population-proportional districts, and the new Assembly districts were numbered from 1 to 165.

On February 1, 1965, the United States Supreme Court confirmed the Federal Statutory Court's order to elect a new New York Legislature in November 1965.

On April 14, 1965, the New York Court of Appeals declared the apportionment of December 1964 as unconstitutional, citing that the New York Constitution provides expressly that the Assembly shall have 150 seats, not 165 as were apportioned. The court also held that, although the constitutional State Senate apportionment formula provides for additional seats, the increase from 58 to 65 was unwarranted.

On May 10, the Federal Statutory Court ordered that the election on November 2, 1965, be held under the December 1964 apportionment, and that the Legislature thus elected re-apportion the seats again by February 1, 1966.

On August 24, it was clarified that, if the Governor and Legislature should not have enacted a new apportionment by February 1, 1966, then the courts should draft a new apportionment for the next election.

On October 11, the U.S. Supreme Court dismissed four appeals against the ruling of the Federal Statutory Court, and upheld the election of a new New York Legislature on November 2.

On January 14, 1966, the Court of Appeals moved the deadline for the new legislative apportionment from February 1 to February 15.

On February 23, the Court of Appeal appointed a commission of five members to map out new districts because the Republican-majority Senate and the Democratic-majority Assembly could not agree on a new apportionment. The commission was chaired by President-elect of the American Bar Association Orison S. Marden, of Scarsdale, who was not affiliated with any party and was deemed politically independent. The other members were Ex-Judges of the Court of Appeals Bruce Bromley (Rep.), of Manhattan, and Charles W. Froessel (Dem.), of Queens; Ex-Republican State Chairman Edwin F. Jaeckle, of Buffalo;  and Robert B. Brady (Dem.), the Counsel to the Joint Legislative Committee on Re-Apportionment.

On March 14, the apportionment draft was submitted to the Court of Appeals.

On March 22, the Court of Appeals accepted the apportionment as drafted, thus becoming the law, without the need of legislative approval. The number of seats in the State Senate was reduced to 57, and the number of seats in the Assembly to 150.

At this time there were two major political parties: the Democratic Party and the Republican Party. The Conservative Party, the Liberal Party, the Socialist Labor Party and the Socialist Workers Party also nominated tickets.

Elections
The 1966 New York state election, was held on November 8. Governor Nelson Rockefeller and Lieutenant Governor Malcolm Wilson were re-elected, both Republicans. The elections to the other three statewide elective offices resulted in a Republican Attorney General; a Democratic State Comptroller with Liberal endorsement; and a Republican Chief Judge with Democratic, Conservative and Liberal endorsement. The approximate party strength at this election, as expressed by the vote for Governor and Lieutenant Governor, was: Republicans 2,691,000; Democrats 2,298,000; Conservatives 513,000; Liberals 507,000; Socialist Labor 12,700; and Socialist Workers 12,500.

All four women members of the previous legislature—Assemblywomen Shirley Chisholm (Dem.), a preschool teacher of Brooklyn; Constance E. Cook (Rep.), a lawyer of Ithaca; Gail Hellenbrand (Dem.), of Brooklyn; and Dorothy H. Rose (Dem.), a high-school teacher and librarian of Angola—were re-elected.

At the same time, 186 delegates to a New York State Constitutional Convention were elected: 15 statewide at-large, and three in each senatorial district. The final result was the election of 101 Democrat/Liberals and 85 Republican/Conservatives.

The New York state election, 1967, was held on November 7. The only statewide elective offices up for election were two seats on the New York Court of Appeals. One vacancy in the State Assembly was filled. The proposed changes to the Constitution were rejected by the voters. The approximate party strength at this election, as expressed by the average vote for Judge of the Court of Appeals, was: Republicans 2,161,000; Democrats 2,070,000; Conservatives 402,000; and Liberals 202,000.

Sessions
The Legislature met for the first regular session (the 190th) at the State Capitol in Albany on January 4, 1967; and adjourned in the morning of April 2.

Anthony J. Travia (Dem.) was re-elected Speaker.

Earl W. Brydges (Rep.) was re-elected Temporary President of the State Senate.

The Constitutional Convention met at the State Capitol in Albany on April 4; and adjourned on September 26. Speaker Anthony J. Travia (Dem.) was elected President of the convention.

The Legislature met for the second regular session (the 191st) at the State Capitol in Albany on January 3, 1968;  and adjourned on May 25.

State Senate

Senators
The asterisk (*) denotes members of the previous Legislature who continued in office as members of this Legislature. Douglas Hudson and James E. Powers changed from the Assembly to the Senate at the beginning of the session. Assemblyman Robert García was elected to fill a vacancy in the Senate.

Note: For brevity, the chairmanships omit the words "...the Committee on (the)..."

Employees
 Secretary: Albert J. Abrams

State Assembly

Assemblymen
The asterisk (*) denotes members of the previous Legislature who continued in office as members of this Legislature.

Note: For brevity, the chairmanships omit the words "...the Committee on (the)..."

Employees
 Clerk: John T. McKennan

Notes

Sources
 1967 Legislature in State Split Down Middle Politically; State Assembly Candidates Who Won Yesterday's Vote; NY Senate Has 31 GOP, 26 Demos in the Tonawanda News, of Tonawanda, on November 9, 1966
 Travia Gets Power Post In Assembly in the Tonawanda News, of Tonawanda, on January 5, 1967
 Members of the New York Senate (1960s) at Political Graveyard
 Members of the New York Assembly (1960s) at Political Graveyard

177
1967 in New York (state)
1968 in New York (state)
1967 U.S. legislative sessions
1968 U.S. legislative sessions